Qacar is a village in the Fuzuli District of Azerbaijan.

History 
The village was located in the Armenian-occupied territories surrounding Nagorno-Karabakh, coming under the control of ethnic Armenian forces during the First Nagorno-Karabakh War in the early 1990s. The village subsequently became part of the breakaway Republic of Artsakh as part of its Martuni Province, referred to as Jivani. It was recaptured by Azerbaijan on November 7, 2020 during the 2020 Nagorno-Karabakh war.

Notable people 
 Bashir Karimov — National Hero of Azerbaijan.

References

External links 
 

Populated places in Fuzuli District